Ryan Greenspan (born February 25, 1982, Sebastopol, California, United States) is an American Professional Paintball player.  Greenspan is a founding member of the professional paintball team San Diego Dynasty, and with that team has won more professional tournaments than any other team in the history of the sport.  Greenspan resides in San Diego, California, which is the team’s current headquarters. Currently Dynasty is wears blue uniforms with a Japanese styled, blue dragon.

In 2010 Greenspan was awarded “Ambassador to the Sport” at the Australian Masters in Sydney, Australia.

Early career
Greenspan, in his amateur days played on three teams, Outta Control, KAPP Factory, and his most notable team, the Ironkids with teammates Oliver Lang, Alex Fraige, and Yosh Rau. In 2000, at age 18, Greenspan and teammates Alex Fraige, Yosh Rau, Brian Cole, and Kenny Chaimberlan won the largest prize in paintball history at the time, five Ford Mustang cars, the prize purse was valued at over $85,000.  This was the turning point in his career before going Pro.

At the end of the 2000 season, Greenspan went Pro and co-founded team San Diego Dynasty.

Professional career
Greenspan currently competes in two major international leagues:  The National X-Ball League (NXL, USA) “Race to” format, the Millennium Series (Europe) CPL Division.  In addition to these major events, Greenspan also attends various individual events around the world such as the World Cup Asia (Malaysia) and the Super Sevens Masters (AUS). Greenspan has appeared in several All Star games and also represented the USA in the Nations Cup, in the European Millennium Series.

In 2011, Greenspan and San Diego Dynasty went on to surpass a historic 50 professional tournament victories, something that has never been done before.

Television, video, and digital likeness

References

External links
 
 
 
 
 

1982 births
Living people
People from Sebastopol, California
Paintball players